In polymer chemistry, gelation (gel transition) is the formation of a gel from a system with polymers. Branched polymers can form links between the chains, which lead to progressively larger polymers. As the linking continues, larger branched polymers are obtained and at a certain extent of the reaction links between the polymer result in the formation of a single macroscopic molecule. At that point in the reaction, which is defined as gel point, the system loses fluidity and viscosity becomes very large. The onset of gelation, or gel point, is accompanied by a sudden increase in viscosity. This "infinite" sized polymer is called the gel or network, which does not dissolve in the solvent, but can swell in it.

Background 
Gelation is promoted by gelling agents.
Gelation can occur either by physical linking or by chemical crosslinking. While the physical gels involve physical bonds, chemical gelation involves covalent bonds. The first quantitative theories of chemical gelation were formulated in the 1940s by Flory and Stockmayer. Critical percolation theory was successfully applied to gelation in 1970s. A number of growth models (diffusion limited aggregation, cluster-cluster aggregation, kinetic gelation) were developed in the 1980s to describe the kinetic aspects of aggregation and gelation.

Quantitative approaches to determine gelation 
It is important to be able to predict the onset of gelation, since it is an irreversible process that dramatically changes the properties of the system.

Average functionality approach 
According to the Carothers equation number-average degree of polymerization  is given by

For the gel  can be considered to be infinite, thus the critical extent of the reaction at the gel point is found as

Flory Stockmayer approach 

Flory and Stockmayer used a statistical approach to derive an expression to predict the gel point by calculating when  approaches infinite size. The statistical approach assumes that (1) the reactivity of the functional groups of the same type is the same and independent of the molecular size and (2) there are no intramolecular reactions between the functional groups on the same molecule.

Consider the polymerization of bifunctional molecules ,  and multifunctional , where  is the functionality. This will lead to the following reaction

This relation yields to an expression for the extent of reaction of A functional groups at the gel point

where r is the ratio of all A groups to all B groups. If more than one type of multifunctional branch unit is present and average  value is used for all monomer molecules with functionality greater than 2.

Note that the relation does not apply for reaction systems containing monofunctional reactants and/or both A and B type of branch units.

Erdős–Rényi model 

Gelation of polymers can be described in the framework of the Erdős–Rényi model or the Lushnikov model, which answers the question when a giant component arises.

Random graph 

The structure of a gel network can be conceptualised as a random graph. This analogy is exploited to calculate the gel point and gel fraction for monomer precursors with arbitrary types of functional groups. Random graphs can be used to derive analytical expressions for simple polymerisation mechanisms, such as step-growth polymerisation, or alternatively, they can be combined with a system of rate equations that are integrated numerically.

See also 
 Mechanics of gelation

References 

Gels
Drug delivery devices
Dosage forms
Colloids
Organic chemistry
Physical chemistry
Polymer chemistry